Hans Krebs (4 March 1898 – 2 May 1945) was a German Army general of infantry who served during World War II. A career soldier, he served in the Reichswehr and the Wehrmacht. He served as the last Chief of Staff of the Oberkommando des Heeres (OKH) during the final phase of the war in Europe (1 April to 1 May  1945). Krebs tried to open surrender negotiations with the Red Army; he committed suicide in the Führerbunker during the early hours of 2 May 1945, two days after Adolf Hitler killed himself.

Early life and education
Krebs was born in Helmstedt. He volunteered for service in the Imperial German Army in 1914, becoming an officer in 1915. Krebs spoke fluent Russian.

Career
In 1931, Krebs worked in the Defence Ministry, where he maintained contacts with the Red Army in the context of joint military exercises conducted by the two countries. Krebs held strong antisemitic and anti-Communist views, as evidenced by his description of the members of the Soviet military delegation that visited Berlin in 1932: "a sly and cunning Jew,... [and] a Jewish half-breed ... insincere, with a suspicious and treacherous nature, apparently a fanatic Communist."

In 1936, Krebs was posted to the German embassy in Moscow as acting military attaché; he held this position up to the invasion of the Soviet Union. As such, he played a role in the Wehrmacht's faulty intelligence into the capabilities of the Red Army.

World War II
During World War II, Krebs reached the position of chief of staff of various army groups. While serving on the Eastern Front, Krebs was promoted to the rank of Generalmajor when Chief of Staff of the 9th Army in February 1942. In March 1943, he was made Chief of Staff of Army Group Centre. In April 1943, he was promoted to Generalleutnant and became a General of Infantry in August 1944. Krebs served as Chief of Staff of Army Group B on the Western Front from September 1944 to February 1945, when he was appointed Deputy Chief of the Army General Staff.

Berlin, 1945
On 1 April 1945, Krebs was appointed Chief of the Army General Staff (OKH). Krebs was in the Führerbunker below the Reich Chancellery garden during the Battle of Berlin.

On 28 April 1945, Krebs made his last telephone call from the Führerbunker. He called Field Marshal Wilhelm Keitel at the new Supreme Command Headquarters in Fürstenberg. He told Keitel that if relief did not arrive within 48 hours, all was lost. Keitel promised to exert the utmost pressure on General Walther Wenck, who commanded the German 12th Army, and General Theodor Busse, who commanded the German 9th Army. The 12th Army was attacking towards Berlin from the west and the 9th Army was attacking from the south. Adolf Hitler had ordered both armies to link up and to come to the relief of Berlin. In addition, forces under General Rudolf Holste were to attack towards Berlin from the north.

Later on 28 April, when it was discovered that Heinrich Himmler was trying to negotiate a backdoor surrender to the western Allies via Count Folke Bernadotte, Krebs became part of a military tribunal ordered by Hitler to court-martial Himmler's SS liaison officer Hermann Fegelein. Fegelein was by that time Eva Braun's brother-in-law. SS-General Wilhelm Mohnke presided over the tribunal which, in addition to Krebs and Mohnke, included SS-General Johann Rattenhuber and General Wilhelm Burgdorf. However, Fegelein was so drunk that he was crying, vomiting and unable to stand up; he even urinated on the floor. It was the opinion of the judges that he was in no condition to stand trial. Therefore, Mohnke closed the proceedings and turned Fegelein over to Rattenhuber and his security squad instead.

On 29 April, Krebs, Burgdorf, Joseph Goebbels, and Martin Bormann witnessed and signed the last will and testament of Adolf Hitler. Hitler dictated the document to his personal private secretary, Traudl Junge. Bormann was head of the Party Chancellery (Parteikanzlei) and private secretary to Hitler. Late that evening, Krebs contacted General Alfred Jodl (Supreme Army Command) by radio and made the following demands: "Request immediate report. Firstly, of the whereabouts of Wenck's spearheads. Secondly, of time intended to attack. Thirdly, of the location of the 9th Army. Fourthly, of the precise place in which the 9th Army will break through. Fifthly, of the whereabouts of General Holste's spearhead."

In the early morning of 30 April, Jodl replied to Krebs: "Firstly, Wenck's spearhead bogged down south of Schwielow Lake. Secondly, 12th Army therefore unable to continue attack on Berlin. Thirdly, bulk of 9th Army surrounded. Fourthly, Holste's Corps on the defensive." Later that afternoon, Hitler and Eva Braun committed suicide.

Surrender and suicide
On 1 May, after Hitler's suicide on 30 April, Goebbels sent Krebs and Colonel Theodor von Dufving, under a white flag, to deliver a letter he had written to General Vasily Chuikov. Dufving was Helmuth Weidling's Chief of Staff. The letter contained surrender terms acceptable to Goebbels. Chuikov, as commander of the Soviet 8th Guards Army, commanded the Soviet forces in central Berlin. Krebs arrived shortly before 4:00 a.m. Krebs, who spoke Russian, informed Chuikov that Hitler and Eva Braun, his wife, had killed themselves in the Führerbunker. Chuikov, who was not aware that there was a bunker complex under the Reich Chancellery or that Hitler was married, calmly said that he already knew all that. Chuikov was not, however, prepared to accept the terms in Goebbels' letter or to negotiate with Krebs. The Soviets were unwilling to accept anything other than unconditional surrender, as had been agreed with the other Allies. Krebs was not authorized by Goebbels to agree to such terms and so the meeting ended with no agreement. According to Traudl Junge, Krebs returned to the bunker looking "worn out, exhausted". Krebs' surrender of Berlin was thus impeded as long as Goebbels was alive.

At around 8:30 p.m. on 1 May, Goebbels removed this impediment by committing suicide. After Goebbels' death, Krebs himself became suicidal. The responsibility for surrendering the city fell to General Helmuth Weidling, the commander of the Berlin Defense Area. On 2 May, with Krebs in no condition to do it himself, Weidling contacted Chuikov to again discuss surrender. Weidling and Chuikov met and had the following conversation in which Chuikov asked about Krebs:

Chuikov: "You are the commander of the Berlin garrison?"
Weidling: "Yes, I am the commander of the LVI Panzer Corps."
Chuikov: "Where is Krebs?"
Weidling: "I saw him yesterday in the Reich Chancellery. I thought he would commit suicide. At first he (Krebs) criticized me because unofficial capitulation started yesterday. The order regarding capitulation has been issued today."

As the Soviets advanced on the Reich Chancellery, Krebs was last seen by others, including Junge, in the Führerbunker when they left to attempt to escape. Junge relates how she approached Krebs to say goodbye and how he straightened up and smoothed his uniform before greeting her for the last time. Krebs and General Wilhelm Burgdorf, along with SS-Obersturmbannführer Franz Schädle of the Führerbegleitkommando, stayed behind with the intention of committing suicide. Sometime in the early morning hours of 2 May, Krebs and Burgdorf committed suicide together by gunshot to the head. Their bodies were later found when Soviet personnel entered the bunker complex. Schädle also committed suicide by gunshot on 2 May 1945.

Thereafter, the corpses of Krebs, the Goebbels family along with the remains of Hitler's dogs were repeatedly buried and exhumed by the Soviets. The last burial was at the SMERSH facility in Magdeburg on 21 February 1946. In 1970, KGB chief Yuri Andropov authorised an operation to destroy the remains. On 4 April 1970, a Soviet KGB team with detailed burial charts secretly exhumed five wooden boxes. The remains from the boxes were thoroughly burned and crushed, with the ashes then thrown into the Biederitz river, a tributary of the nearby Elbe.

Positions held
His last decade saw the following appointments:

 1936–1939: military attaché in Moscow (Krebs spoke fluent Russian)
 1939: Chief of Army Training Section
 1939–1942: Chief of Staff VII Corps
 1942–1943: Chief of Staff German Ninth Army, Eastern Front
 1943–1944: Chief of Staff Army Group Centre, Eastern Front
 1944–1945: Chief of Staff Army Group B, Western Front
 1945: Deputy Chief of the Army General Staff (OKH)
 1945, 1 April – 1 May: Chief of the Army General Staff (OKH)

Awards
 Iron Cross (1914) 2nd Class (22 August 1915) & 1st Class (6 February 1917)

 Clasp to the Iron Cross (1939) 2nd Class (14 May 1940)  & 1st Class (18 May 1940)
 German Cross in Gold on 26 January 1942 as Oberst im Generalstab in the VII Army Corps
 Knight's Cross of the Iron Cross with Oak Leaves
 Knight's Cross on 26 March 1944 as Generalleutnant and Chief of General Staff of Army Group Centre
 749th Oak Leaves on 20 February 1945 as General der Infanterie and Chief of Staff of Army Group B

See also

 Battle in Berlin – 1945
 Downfall, 2004 film where Krebs is portrayed by Rolf Kanies
 Gotthard Heinrici, Commander of Army Group Vistula

References

Explanatory notes

Citations

Bibliography

 
 
 
 
 
 
 
 
 
 
 
 
 
 

1898 births
1945 deaths
People from Helmstedt
Generals of Infantry (Wehrmacht)
Recipients of the Knight's Cross of the Iron Cross with Oak Leaves
German military personnel who committed suicide
Nazis who committed suicide in Germany
Suicides by firearm in Germany
Reichswehr personnel
1945 suicides
Military personnel from Lower Saxony
German Army generals of World War II
German Army personnel of World War I
German military attachés
Recipients of the Gold German Cross
Recipients of the clasp to the Iron Cross, 1st class